The Australia national cricket team toured New Zealand in February and March 2005 and played a three-match Test series against the New Zealand national cricket team. Australia won the Test series 2–0. New Zealand were captained by Stephen Fleming and Australia by Ricky Ponting. In addition, the teams played a five-match series of Limited Overs Internationals (LOI) which Australia won 5–0.

In the third Test in Auckland, James Marshall made his debut for New Zealand. Also playing in the same match was his twin brother, Hamish. This was the first time that identical twins have played together in the same Test side.

T20I series

Only T20I

ODI series

1st ODI

2nd ODI

3rd ODI

4th ODI

5th ODI

Test series

1st Test

2nd Test

3rd Test

References

External links

2005 in Australian cricket
2005 in New Zealand cricket
2005
International cricket competitions in 2004–05
New Zealand cricket seasons from 2000–01